Richard Preston Carlisle (born October 27, 1959) is an American basketball coach and former player who is the head coach for the Indiana Pacers of the National Basketball Association (NBA). He has previously served as head coach of the Detroit Pistons and Dallas Mavericks of the National Basketball Association (NBA). As a player, Carlisle played for the Boston Celtics, New York Knicks, and New Jersey Nets. He is also one of only eleven people to win an NBA championship both as a player and as a coach.

Playing career
Carlisle was raised in Lisbon, New York. He attended Lisbon Central High School, then spent a year at Worcester Academy. He played two years of college basketball at the University of Maine from 1979 to 1981, before transferring to the University of Virginia. Carlisle was a starter for the 1982–83 Virginia Cavaliers team that featured the three-time college player of the year Ralph Sampson. UVA was the number one ranked team in the country prior to being defeated by Chaminade on December 23, 1982. In the 1983 NCAA tournament, UVA was the number one seed in the West and made it to the Elite Eight before losing to eventual NCAA national champion North Carolina State. Carlisle was the co-captain on the 1983–84 Cavaliers team and helped lead them to the Final Four where they lost 49–47 in overtime to the Houston Cougars team led by Hakeem Olajuwon. Carlisle averaged 12.5 points and 3.3 rebounds per game during his college career.

NBA
After graduating in 1984 Carlisle was selected 70th overall by the Boston Celtics in the 1984 NBA draft, where he played alongside Larry Bird. Under Celtics' coach K. C. Jones he won the NBA championship in 1986 and lost in the finals in 1985 and 1987. In the 1986 NBA finals series, in limited playing time, Carlisle made every shot he took (3 for 3). 

In a limited reserve role from 1984 to 1987 Carlisle averaged 2.2 points, 1.0 assists and 0.8 rebounds per game. He then played for the Albany Patroons of the Continental Basketball Association (CBA) under Bill Musselman. He then signed as a free agent with the New York Knicks, where he played under coach Rick Pitino alongside emerging star Patrick Ewing. In 1989, Carlisle played in five games with the New Jersey Nets under Bill Fitch.

Coaching career
Later in 1989, he accepted an assistant coaching position with the Nets, where he spent five seasons under Bill Fitch and Chuck Daly. In 1994, Carlisle joined the assistant coaching staff with the Portland Trail Blazers under coach P. J. Carlesimo, where he spent three seasons.

In 1997, Carlisle joined the Indiana Pacers organization as an assistant coach under former teammate, Larry Bird. During his time as Pacers assistant coach, he helped the Pacers to two of their best seasons ever. First, in 1997–98, the Pacers stretched the Chicago Bulls to the limit, narrowly losing the deciding seventh game of the Eastern Conference Finals to the eventual NBA champion. Then, in 1999–2000 season, the Pacers made the NBA Finals for the first time, ultimately losing to the Los Angeles Lakers. Bird stepped down as coach, and pushed for Carlisle to be selected as his replacement, but Pacers team president Donnie Walsh gave the job to Isiah Thomas.

Detroit Pistons
For the 2001–02 season, Carlisle was hired by the Detroit Pistons to be their new head coach. In two seasons as Pistons' head coach, Carlisle led the team to consecutive 50–32 records (.610) with Central Division titles and playoff appearances. He was named Coach of the Year in 2002. However, the Pistons fired Carlisle after the 2002–03 season with a year remaining on his contract and hired Larry Brown. Friction between Carlisle and team ownership was cited as one of the primary reasons for the firing. Carlisle's Pistons had just dispatched Brown's Philadelphia 76ers in the Conference Semifinals before being swept by the New Jersey Nets in the Eastern Conference Finals.

Indiana Pacers

For the 2003–04 season, Carlisle returned to the Pacers as head coach (Isiah Thomas had been fired, almost immediately after Larry Bird was brought back as the new President of Basketball Operations). In his first season, Carlisle led the Pacers to the Central Division title and NBA's best regular-season record at 61–21 (74.4%), setting a franchise record for wins (both in the NBA and ABA). In the playoffs, the team eliminated both the Boston Celtics and Miami Heat, before losing to the Detroit Pistons in the Eastern Conference Finals. That year, he coached the East All-Stars at the All-Star Game. In 2005, the Pacers roster was decimated by injuries (most notably, those of Jermaine O'Neal, Stephen Jackson and Jamaal Tinsley) and suspensions that were meted out after the Pacers–Pistons brawl at The Palace of Auburn Hills, which resulted in Ron Artest being suspended for the rest of the season, Jackson being suspended for 30 games and O'Neal being suspended for 15 games. However, Carlisle was still able to rally the Pacers to the NBA Playoffs that season. As the sixth seed, they again defeated the Boston Celtics in the first round, before being defeated once again by the eventual Eastern Conference champion, the Detroit Pistons.

The Pacers slipped to a .500 record in 2005–06 and barely made the playoffs, losing in the first round. Despite this, Bird and Pacers CEO Donnie Walsh did not hold Carlisle responsible for the Pacers' lackluster performances in the past two seasons, and showed it in October 2006 when they signed Carlisle to a multiyear contract extension. The Pacers also gave him the additional title of executive vice president of basketball operations.

After the Pacers finished the 2006–07 season with a 35–47 record (missing the playoffs for the first time since 1997), Bird fired Carlisle as head coach. Carlisle understood the decision, saying that the Pacers needed "a new voice." In four seasons with the Pacers, Carlisle compiled a 181–147 record. The Pacers offered to let Carlisle stay on in the front office, but Carlisle also resigned that post on June 12, 2007.

After leaving Indiana, Carlisle worked as a studio analyst for ESPN before signing with the Dallas Mavericks as the team's new head coach.

Dallas Mavericks

On May 9, 2008, Carlisle signed a four-year deal with Mark Cuban's Dallas Mavericks, replacing Avery Johnson. He led them to a 50–32 record including a first round win against the San Antonio Spurs. They would lose to the Denver Nuggets 1–4 in the Western Conference Semifinals. The next year, he coached the Mavs to a 55–27 record, first in Southwest Division and second in the West, but lost in the first round to the Spurs. In 2010, Dallas won sixteen of its first twenty games in a competitive Western Conference.

The 2010–11 season was Carlisle's most successful as a head coach. The Mavericks finished the regular season with a 57–25 win–loss record. On May 8, 2011, they swept the two-time defending champion Los Angeles Lakers in the Western Conference semifinals. On May 25, 2011, the Mavericks enjoyed a 4–1 series win over the Oklahoma City Thunder in the Western Conference Finals, the first Conference Finals victory of his coaching career. In the 2011 NBA Finals, he coached the Mavericks to a 4–2 series victory over the Miami Heat for the franchise's first championship.

In the 2012 playoffs, the Mavericks lost 0–4 to Thunder in the first round. On May 15, 2012, Carlisle agreed to a new four-year deal with the Mavericks. In 2013, the Mavericks finished 41–41 and missed the playoffs for the first time since 2000. In 2014, Carlisle led the Mavericks back to the playoffs as the eighth seed with a 49–33 record where they would meet their in-state rivals San Antonio Spurs in the first round. The Mavericks lost the series in seven games as the Spurs went on to win the 2014 NBA Finals.

On January 30, 2015, he recorded his 600th win in a game against the Heat. He signed a new five-year deal on November 5, 2015. Four days earlier, Carlisle recorded his 340th win as Mavericks coach, passing Don Nelson as the winningest coach in franchise history. 

On December 2, 2017, Carlisle recorded his 700th win in a game against the Los Angeles Clippers.

On January 13, 2021, Carlisle recorded his 800th win in a game against the Charlotte Hornets. 

On June 17, 2021, Carlisle stepped down as the Mavericks head coach with two years remaining on his contract.

Return to Indiana
On June 24, 2021, Carlisle was hired as the head coach of the Indiana Pacers.

Personal life
Carlisle and his wife have one daughter. He is an avid pianist and private pilot, who as of September 2015 had logged nearly 200 hours flying his Cirrus SR22T single-engine light aircraft.

Head coaching record

|-
| align="left"|Detroit
| align="left"|
| 82||50||32|||| align="center"|1st in Central||10||4||6||
| align="center"|Lost in Conference semifinals
|-
| align="left"|Detroit
| align="left"|
| 82||50||32|||| align="center"|1st in Central||17||8||9||
| align="center"|Lost in Conference Finals
|-
| align="left"|Indiana
| align="left"|
| 82||61||21|||| align="center"|1st in Central||16||10||6||
| align="center"|Lost in Conference Finals
|-
| align="left"|Indiana
| align="left"|
| 82||44||38|||| align="center"|3rd in Central||13||6||7||
| align="center"|Lost in Conference semifinals
|-
| align="left"|Indiana
| align="left"|
| 82||41||41|||| align="center"|3rd in Central||6||2||4||
| align="center"|Lost in first round
|-
| align="left"|Indiana
| align="left"|
| 82||35||47|||| align="center"|4th in Central||—||—||—||—
| align="center"|Missed playoffs
|-
| align="left"|Dallas
| align="left"|
| 82||50||32|||| align="center"|3rd in Southwest||10||5||5||
| align="center"|Lost in Conference semifinals
|-
| align="left"|Dallas
| align="left"|
| 82||55||27|||| align="center"|1st in Southwest||6||2||4||
| align="center"|Lost in first round
|- ! style="background:#FDE910;"
| align="left"|Dallas
| align="left"|
| 82||57||25|||| align="center"|2nd in Southwest||21||16||5||
| align="center"|Won NBA Championship
|-
| align="left"|Dallas
| align="left"|
| 66||36||30|||| align="center"|3rd in Southwest||4||0||4||
| align="center"|Lost in first round
|-
| align="left"|Dallas
| align="left"|
| 82||41||41|||| align="center"|4th in Southwest||—||—||—||—
| align="center"|Missed playoffs
|-
| align="left"|Dallas
| align="left"|
| 82||49||33|||| align="center"|4th in Southwest||7||3||4||
| align="center"|Lost in first round
|-
| align="left"|Dallas
| align="left"|
| 82||50||32|||| align="center"|3rd in Southwest||5||1||4||
| align="center"|Lost in first round
|-
| align="left"|Dallas
| align="left"|
| 82||42||40|||| align="center"|2nd in Southwest||5||1||4||
| align="center"|Lost in first round
|-
| align="left"|Dallas
| align="left"|
| 82||33||49|||| align="center"|4th in Southwest||—||—||—||—
| align="center"|Missed playoffs
|-
| align="left"|Dallas
| align="left"|
| 82||24||58|||| align="center"|4th in Southwest||—||—||—||—
| align="center"|Missed playoffs
|-
| align="left"|Dallas
| align="left"|
| 82||33||49|||| align="center"|5th in Southwest||—||—||—||—
| align="center"|Missed playoffs
|-
| align="left"|Dallas
| align="left"|
| 75||43||32|||| align="center"|2nd in Southwest||6||2||4||
| align="center"|Lost in first round
|-
| align="left"|Dallas
| align="left"|
| 72||42||30|||| align="center"|1st in Southwest||7||3||4||
| align="center"|Lost in first round
|-
| align="left"|Indiana
| align="left"|
| 82||25||57|||| align="center"|4th in Central||—||—||—||—
| align="center"|Missed playoffs
|- class="sortbottom"
| align="center" colspan="2"|Career||1,607||861||746|||| ||133||63||70||||

References

External links

 College statistics at Sports-Reference
 Coaching statistics at Basketball-Reference
 Coach profile at NBA

1959 births
Living people
Albany Patroons players
American men's basketball coaches
American men's basketball players
Basketball coaches from New York (state)
Basketball players from New York (state)
Boston Celtics draft picks
Boston Celtics players
Dallas Mavericks head coaches
Detroit Pistons head coaches
Indiana Pacers head coaches
Maine Black Bears men's basketball players
National Basketball Association championship-winning head coaches
New York Knicks players
New Jersey Nets assistant coaches
New Jersey Nets players
People from Lisbon, New York
People from Ogdensburg, New York
Portland Trail Blazers assistant coaches
Shooting guards
Virginia Cavaliers men's basketball players
Worcester Academy alumni